Aleksei Vyacheslavovich Shemetov (born 27 April 1973) is a former Russian football player.

References

1973 births
Living people
Russian footballers
FC Lokomotiv Nizhny Novgorod players
Russian Premier League players
FC Torpedo NN Nizhny Novgorod players
FC Nizhny Novgorod (2007) players

Association football midfielders